Celso Al. Carunungan is a Filipino writer, novelist, and scriptwriter in English and Filipino languages.  In 1959, he won the Best Story prize from the Filipino Academy of Movie Arts and Sciences (FAMAS) for writing the story and screenplay for the Tagalog-language film Biyaya ng Lupa  ("Blessings of the Land")  Among his works are Like a Big Brave Man, a novel published in New York in 1960 then in Manila in 1963; Return to Gomora and Other Stories (1963); Panorama of World Literature for Filipinos: Fourth Year (1966); Satanas sa Lupa (1971), a Tagalog novel; and To Die a Thousand Deaths: A Novel on the Life and Times of Lorenzo Ruiz.  He was a production consultant for the 1982 American movie The Year of Living Dangerously.

References

Tagalog-language writers
English-language writers from the Philippines
Filipino male short story writers
Filipino short story writers
Filipino screenwriters
Filipino novelists
Filipino non-fiction writers
Living people
Year of birth missing (living people)
Male non-fiction writers